Sir Arthur Sydney Hutchinson  (21 March 1896 – 18 January 1981) was a British soldier and civil servant. He was the son of Sir Sydney Hutchinson.

He was awarded the CVO in 1937, the CB 1946; and knighted (KBE) in 1953.

References

 ‘HUTCHINSON, Sir Arthur (Sydney)’, Who Was Who, A & C Black, an imprint of Bloomsbury Publishing plc, 1920–2008; online edn, Oxford University Press, Dec 2012 ; online edn, Nov 2012 accessed 28 Feb 2013

1896 births
1981 deaths
Companions of the Order of the Bath
Commanders of the Royal Victorian Order
Knights Commander of the Order of the British Empire
Civil servants in the Home Office
British Army personnel of World War I
People educated at St Paul's School, London
Alumni of New College, Oxford